Vision science is the scientific study of visual perception. Researchers in vision science can be called vision scientists, especially if their research spans some of the science's many disciplines.

Vision science encompasses all studies of vision, such as how human and non-human organisms process visual information, how conscious visual perception works in humans, how to exploit visual perception for effective communication, and how artificial systems can do the same tasks. Vision science overlaps with or encompasses disciplines such as ophthalmology and optometry, neuroscience(s), psychology (particularly sensation and perception psychology, cognitive psychology, linguistics, biopsychology, psychophysics, and neuropsychology), physics (particularly optics), ethology, and computer science (particularly computer vision, artificial intelligence, and computer graphics), as well as other engineering related areas such as data visualization, user interface design, and human factors and ergonomics. Below is a list of pertinent journals and international conferences.

Journals

Scientific journals exclusively or predominantly concerned with vision science include:
 Investigative Ophthalmology & Vision Science (IOVS)
 Ophthalmology
 JAMA Ophthalmology
 American Journal of Ophthalmology
 British Journal of Ophthalmology
 Progress in Retinal and Eye Research
 Current Opinion in Ophthalmology
 Survey of Ophthalmology
 Annual Review of Vision Science
 Journal of Vision
 Vision Research (including Clinical Vision Sciences)
 Perception and i-Perception
 Spatial Vision
 Attention Perception & Psychophysics (previously Perception & Psychophysics)
 Journal of the Optical Society of America A
 Optometry and Vision Science
 Ophthalmic and Physiological Optics (OPO)
 Graefe's Archive for Clinical and Experimental Ophthalmology

Conferences

 Association for Research in Vision and Ophthalmology (ARVO)
 American Academy of Ophthalmology (AAO) Annual Meeting
 European Conference on Visual Perception (ECVP)
 Annual Meeting of the Vision Sciences Society (VSS)
 Asia Pacific Conference on Vision (APVC)

See also

 Brain
 Color constancy
 Color vision
 Computer vision
 Eye
 Linguistic relativity and the color naming debate
 Neuropsychology
 Neuroscience
 Ophthalmology
 Optical illusions
 Optometry
 Primary colors
 Psychophysics
 Visual cortex
 Visual neuroscience
 Visual system

References

 Palmer, S.E. (1999). Vision Science: Photons to Phenomenology. MIT Press. .

External links

 VisionScience – an Internet resource for research in human and animal vision.
 Visiome Platform – digital research resource archive for vision science by the Neuroinformatics Japan Center
 European Conference on Visual Perception – an international scientific conference on vision science

Color
Interdisciplinary subfields
Vision